Pahokee is a 2019 American documentary film directed by Ivete Lucas and Patrick Bresnan about the small rural town of Pahokee located in the Florida Everglades. The film uses an observational approach to follow four teenagers as they navigate their senior year of high school. The film premiered in the United States at the Sundance Film Festival and internationally at Visions du Réel in Switzerland.

Synopsis 
The film follows four high school students at Pahokee High School, a school that is integral to the surrounding community. The film follows Na'Kerria, a high school cheerleader who is hoping to become Miss Pahokee High School. She spends her senior year multi-tasking between working at a fried fish restaurant, cheerleading, campaigning for the pageant, and getting her schoolwork done. Next is Jocabed, the youngest daughter of Mexican immigrants and a high-achieving student who is working to finish the year at the top of her class and go to her dream school, the University of Florida. Next, Junior is a father to a one-year-old baby girl who is struggling to balance schoolwork, marching band, and the demands of parenthood. Finally, BJ is the football team co-captain who is a budding leader on and off the field. With the help of his parents, he hopes to attend college and possibly play football there.

Reception 
As of February 2022 the film has a 100% rating on Rotten Tomatoes. Jen Yamato of the Los Angeles Times says, "with a patient and unobtrusive eye, filmmakers Lucas and Bresnan paint impressionistic portraits of a quartet of charismatic teenagers over the course of a pivotal school year.”  Variety (magazine) hails the film as, "lively and rousing as a generational snapshot, buoyed by the lovable, resilient kids at its heart." Following the film's premiere at the Sundance Film Festival, Daniel Fienberg of The Hollywood Reporter said "Pahokee is the best documentary I've seen this Sundance. It's 'America To Me' only verité and in a 112-minute micro.”

Screenings

References 

2019 films
2019 documentary films
American documentary films
2010s English-language films
2010s American films